The Highlands Historic District is a historic district roughly bounded by June, Cherry, and Weetamoe Streets, Lincoln, Highland, President, North Main, and Hood Avenues in Fall River, Massachusetts. The district lies just north of the Lower Highlands Historic District.

The Highlands Historic District was added to the National Register of Historic Places in 1983.

History
The area known today as the "highlands" in Fall River was originally known as the Rodman Farm. The area is located along a high ridge with views of the Taunton River and Mount Hope Bay. After the original downtown area of the city suffered a devastating fire in 1843, the wealthy mill owners and their families gradually sought to distance themselves from the central business district.

The Highlands Historic District contains a wide variety of mostly residential homes largely built between 1840 and 1925. Just one home, the Church-Tory house (c.1750) at 96 French Street predates the major development of the area.

The district also includes North Park, designed by the Olmsted Brothers in the mid-1880s.

Contributing properties (partial listing)

Residential
Charles Shove House (c.1850) 715 High Street, Italianate
Church-Tory House (c.1750), 96 French Street, Colonial
Jefferson Borden House (c.1840), 386 High Street, Greek Revival
Remington-Borden House (c.1858), 511 Rock Street, Carpenter Gothic
Edmund Chase House (c.1874), 388 Rock Street, Second Empire
Philip Borden House (c.1884), 669 Rock Street, Queen Anne
Simeon Borden House (1876), 484 Highland Street, Ruskinian Gothic
Charles Buffington House (1882), 216 Prospect Street, Queen Anne
Maplecroft (Allen-Borden House) (1889), 306 French Street, Queen Anne
Michael T. Hudner House (1900), 674 Highland Avenue

Educational/public
Westall School (1907), 276 Maple Street
Fall River Technical School (1929), 290 Rock Street
Quequechan Firehouse (1873), 330 Prospect Street
Anawan No. 6 Firehouse (1873), North Main Street

Religious
First Congregational Church (1913), 282 Rock Street
United Presbyterian Church (1924), 414 Rock Street
Temple Beth-El (1928), 385 High Street

Properties with separate NRHP listings
B.M.C Durfee High School (1886), 289 Rock Street, added in 1981
Osborn House (1843), 456 Rock Street, added in 1980

See also
Lower Highlands Historic District
National Register of Historic Places listings in Fall River, Massachusetts
History of Fall River, Massachusetts

References

External links
Gallery of Homes in the Highlands
photo of Rock Street in winter, from Asergeev.com

Historic districts in Bristol County, Massachusetts
Fall River, Massachusetts
National Register of Historic Places in Fall River, Massachusetts
Historic districts on the National Register of Historic Places in Massachusetts